Ernst Frick was a Swiss footballer who played as a midfielder for Switzerland in the 1934 FIFA World Cup. He also played for FC Luzern.

References

Swiss men's footballers
Switzerland international footballers
1934 FIFA World Cup players
Association football midfielders
FC Luzern players
Year of birth missing